Marc Woods is a former British swimmer, who competed at five Paralympic Games, winning 12 medals.

Early life
A swimmer at county-level, Marc developed cancer as a teenager. Aged 17, he had his left foot amputated as a result of the cancer. The day after having his stitches removed, he returned to the pool as part of his rehabilitation. Within a year, he was swimming faster times with one foot than he previously had with two, and just 18 months after he finished his chemotherapy he was selected to represent Great Britain.

Career
Woods subsequently competed at European & World Championships and Paralympic Games. In his 17 years of competition he won 12 Paralympic medals from five Paralympic Games held in Seoul, Barcelona, Atlanta, Sydney and Athens, and four of those medals being gold. Woods also won a further 21 medals from European and World Championships. After he retired from international swimming in 2004, he went on to commentate for BBC Sport in Beijing and simultaneously developed a successful consultancy business and writing book called "Personal Best." He also embarked on a series of new challenges such as developing mountaineering skills by trekking on Nepal, Ecuador and Peru. He also climbed the world's highest volcano Cotopaxi in Ecuador, Mont Pelvoux part of the Massif des Ecrins in France and the 22,200 ft Mera Peak in Nepal. Woods currently works for many organizations such as the RBS, Barclays, IBM, Adidas, GSK, John Lewis Partnership, BBC, Ceridian, etc. He travels and works as a motivational speaker.

Personal life
Woods is married and has a daughter.

Accomplishments
 An ambassador for London 2012 Olympics
 Member of the British Paralympic Advisory Panel for London 2012 Games
 Trustee of Teenage Cancer Trust
 Board Member of Youth Sports Trust
 Ambassador for CANSA (South Africa’s Cancer Charity)
 Patron of the Bone Cancer Research Trust
 BBC TV Commentator
 Awarded honorary Doctorate by Middlesex University
 Made a Freeman of the City of London
 Honorary Citizen of Pensacola – Florida
 Founding member of the British Athletes Council

Publications
 "Personal Best: 10 life lessons to help you discover the real you", 2005 
 "Personal Best: How to Achieve your Full Potential (2nd Edition)", 2011

References

Further reading
 English Federation of Disability Sport, World Cancer Day: Two swimmers' stories

External links
 
 
 

Year of birth missing (living people)
Living people
English male swimmers
Paralympic swimmers of Great Britain
Paralympic gold medalists for Great Britain
Paralympic silver medalists for Great Britain
Paralympic bronze medalists for Great Britain
Swimmers at the 1988 Summer Paralympics
Swimmers at the 1992 Summer Paralympics
Swimmers at the 1996 Summer Paralympics
Swimmers at the 2000 Summer Paralympics
Swimmers at the 2004 Summer Paralympics
Medalists at the 1988 Summer Paralympics
Medalists at the 1992 Summer Paralympics
Medalists at the 1996 Summer Paralympics
Medalists at the 2000 Summer Paralympics
Medalists at the 2004 Summer Paralympics
Paralympic medalists in swimming
Television presenters with disabilities
British male freestyle swimmers
British male backstroke swimmers
S10-classified Paralympic swimmers